The Australia Men's National Squash Team represents Australia in international squash team competitions, and is governed by Squash Australia.

Since 1967, Australia has won 8 World Squash Team Open titles. Their most recent title came in 2003.

Current team
 Cameron Pilley
 Ryan Cuskelly
 Rex Hedrick
 Zac Alexander

Results

World Team Squash Championships

See also 
 Squash Australia
 Squash in Australia
 World Team Squash Championships
 Australia women's national squash team

References

External links 
 Team Australia

Squash teams
Men's national squash teams
Squash
Squash in Australia